The men's lightweight (60 kg/132 lbs) K-1 category at the W.A.K.O. World Championships 2007 in Belgrade was the third lightest of the K-1 tournaments, involving eleven fighters from three continents (Europe, Asia and North America).  Each of the matches was three rounds of two minutes each and were fought under K-1 rules.

Due to the tournament having too few fighters for a sixteen-man competition, five of the contestants had byes through to the quarter finals.  The gold medal winner was Elbar Umarakaev from Russia who defeated Turkish fighter Emrah Ogut in the final.  Semi finalists the Mexican Gillermo Estrada Martinez and Ukrainian Serhiy Adamchuk won bronze medals.

Results

See also
List of WAKO Amateur World Championships
List of WAKO Amateur European Championships
List of male kickboxers

References

External links
 WAKO World Association of Kickboxing Organizations Official Site

Kickboxing events at the WAKO World Championships 2007 Belgrade
2007 in kickboxing
Kickboxing in Serbia